The Province of Silesia was a province of Prussia from 1815 to 1919. The Silesia region was part of the Prussian realm since 1740 and established as an official province in 1815, then became part of the German Empire in 1871. In 1919, as part of the Free State of Prussia within Weimar Germany, Silesia was divided into the provinces of Upper Silesia and Lower Silesia. Silesia was reunified briefly from 1 April 1938 to 27 January 1941 as a province of Nazi Germany before being divided back into Upper Silesia and Lower Silesia.

Breslau (present-day Wrocław, Poland) was the provincial capital.

Geography

The territory on both sides of the Oder river formed the southeastern part of the Prussian kingdom. It comprised the bulk of the former Bohemian crown land of Upper and Lower Silesia as well as the adjacent County of Kladsko, which the Prussian King Frederick the Great had all conquered from the Austrian Habsburg monarchy under Empress Maria Theresa in the 18th century Silesian Wars. It furthermore included the northeastern part of Upper Lusatia around Görlitz and Lauban, ceded to Prussia by the Kingdom of Saxony according to the resolutions of the Vienna Congress in 1815.

The province bordered on the Prussian heartland of Brandenburg (including the newly acquired lands of Lower Lusatia) in the northwest, and on the Grand Duchy of Posen (Province of Posen from 1848) in the north, i.e. the Greater Polish lands that before the 18th century Partitions of Poland had belonged to the Polish–Lithuanian Commonwealth. In the northeast, Upper Silesia bordered on Congress Poland, i.e. the Kingdom of Poland which had been reconstituted from the Duchy of Warsaw and was made up of former parts of the Prussian and Austrian partitions; Congress Poland was in a personal union with the Russian Empire until 1867 when it was formally integrated as the Vistula Land. In the east lay the Austrian share, the Lesser Polish Kingdom of Galicia and Lodomeria with the Free City of Kraków (until 1846), and in the south the remaining Bohemian crown lands of Austrian Silesia, Moravia and Bohemia proper. The incorporated Upper Lusatian strip of land in the west touched the remaining territory of the Saxon kingdom and in the furthest west the Prussian Province of Saxony.

History

Prussian Silesia, 1740–1815
The coronation of Maria Theresa as queen regnant of the Kingdom of Bohemia immediately triggered an invasion of the region of Silesia by King Frederick the Great of Prussia, thereby starting the War of the Austrian Succession (1740–1748). By the end of the First Silesian War in 1742, the Prussian forces had conquered almost all of the Habsburg crown land in Silesia, while according to the peace treaties of Breslau and Berlin, only some smaller parts in the extreme southeast, like the Duchy of Teschen as well as the southern parts of the duchies of Troppau and Nysa, remained possessions of the Habsburg monarchy as Austrian Silesia. Attempts by Maria Theresa to regain the crown land in the Second Silesian War (1744–1745) failed and she ultimately had to relinquish her claims over Silesia by the Treaty of Dresden.

The Third Silesian War (1756–1763), a theatre of the Seven Years' War, once again confirmed Prussian control over most of Silesia, and due to its predominantly Protestant population especially in Lower Silesia, it became one of the most loyal territories of the House of Hohenzollern. When the Prussian territories were reorganized upon the Congress of Vienna, the Province of Silesia was created out of the territories acquired by Prussia in the Silesian Wars, as well as those Upper Lusatian territories which King Frederick Augustus I of Saxony had to relinquish due to his indecisive attitude in the Napoleonic Wars. As the lands had been part of the Holy Roman Empire until 1806, Silesia was among the western Prussian provinces that lay within the borders of the German Confederation.

Province of Silesia

Kingdom of Prussia and German Empire

In 1815, after the Napoleonic wars, Prussian Silesia was formally reorganized into the Province of Silesia. The character of the province's eastern third, Upper Silesia, had been much lesser shaped by the medieval German Ostsiedlung. According to the census of 1905, about three-quarters of the Silesian inhabitants were German–speaking, while a majority of the population to the east of the Oder river spoke Polish (including Silesian and Lach dialects). Because of the extended iron ore and black coal deposits of the Upper Silesian Coal Basin, there was considerable industrialization and urbanization in Upper Silesia and many people from neighbouring Posen and Congress Poland immigrated at that time. In 1871, Silesia became part of the German Empire as a province of Prussia following the unification of Germany. The Upper Silesian Industrial Region was the second largest industrial agglomeration of the German Empire after the Ruhr area. Over decades the mainly Catholic Upper Silesian citizens in majority voted for the German Centre Party, while the Lower Silesian constituencies were dominated by the Free-minded Party and the Social Democrats. Ethnic tensions rose on the eve of World War I, with politicians like Wojciech Korfanty separating from the Centre Party and giving utterance to distinct Polish interests.

Weimar Republic 
In 1919, a year after the war ended, the parts of Silesia remaining in Weimar Germany were re-organized into the two provinces of Lower Silesia (Niederschlesien) and Upper Silesia (Oberschlesien, the former Regierungsbezirk Oppeln). After three Silesian Uprisings and the 1921 Upper Silesia plebiscite, the East Upper Silesian part of the province around the industrial town of Kattowitz was transferred to the Second Polish Republic and incorporated into the Silesian Voivodeship in 1922. Further, in 1920 the Hlučín Region was ceded to Czechoslovakia according to the Treaty of Versailles.

Division after WWI

Nazi Germany

On 1 April 1938 the Province of Silesia was re-established by Nazi Germany by uniting the existing Upper Silesia and Lower Silesia provinces, then following the conquest of Poland, the border was extended eastwards when parts of Polish Silesia were merged into the province. On 27 January 1941, during World War II, the province of Silesia was divided again by reverting into Upper Silesia and Lower Silesia.

Upon the implementation of the Oder-Neisse line according to the 1945 Potsdam Agreement, most of the Prussian Silesia Province became part of Poland, incorporated into the Lubusz, Lower Silesian, Opole and Silesian Voivodeships. The German-speaking population left or was expelled following World War II, though a minority remains. A smaller western part of the former Silesia Province lies within modern German states of Saxony and Brandenburg.

Demographics 
According to the Prussian census of 1890, the province of Silesia had a population of 4,224,458, of which 3,105,843 (73.52%) spoke German, 973,596 (23.05%) spoke Polish, 68,781 (1.63%) spoke Czech, 26,257 (0.62%) spoke Sorbian and 48,045 (1.14%) identified as bilingual.

Regierungsbezirk Liegnitz - 1,047,405 (96.41% German, 2.51% Sorbian, 0.53% Polish, 0.11% Czech, 0.38% bilingual).

Regierungsbezirk Breslau - 1,599,322 (95.63% German, 3.08% Polish, 0.59% Czech, 0.64% bilingual).

Regierungsbezirk Oppeln - 1,577,731 (58.23% Polish, 35.91% German, 3.69% Czech, 2.14% bilingual).

Administration

References

Notes

External links 
 Coats of arms of Upper Silesian towns while part of the Province of Silesia 
 Administrative subdivision and population breakdown of the Province of Silesia in 1900/1900 (in German)

 
1939 establishments in Germany
1941 disestablishments in Germany
History of Silesia
Silesia, Province of
1815 establishments in Prussia
Former eastern territories of Germany